The Ridgeway is a  "cycling permitted pedestrian priority" footpath owned by Thames Water in southeast London. It runs between Plumstead and Crossness on an embankment that covers the  Joseph Bazalgette Southern Outfall Sewer.

Route

The Ridgeway runs ENE/WSW: the western two thirds between Plumstead railway station and The Link Thamesmead, home of the London College of Performing Arts, is in the Royal Borough of Greenwich.

The remainder of the Ridgeway towards the Thames Path and Crossness Pumping Station is in the London Borough of Bexley.

A similar path called the Greenway covers the Northern Outfall Sewer.

History
The sewers were installed after an outbreak of cholera in 1853 and the "Great Stink" of 1858.

Development
The pathway at the Greenwich end of the Ridgeway was refurbished in 2010 and the pathway at the Bexley end of the Ridgeway was refurbished in 2017. 

The Ridgeway is incorporated in to the Thamesmead 5K and family 1 mile runs organised by the Thamesmead running club and Peabody Trust.

The Ridgeway and several surrounding areas have been recognised by the Mayor of London and the London boroughs as a site of importance for nature conservation (SINC) since 2016.

In 2018, the Plumstead entrance to the Ridgeway was refurbished, with public art work installed by local artist Sam Skinner and Ninth Seal.

A petition was created by local users of the Ridgeway for litter bins to be installed along its length. The petition was rejected by Greenwich council in January 2018.

In 2018, the American artist Duke Riley installed a temporary art installations at the end of the Ridgeway, on land previously used as the driving range for the Thamesview Golf centre. The event organised as part of the London International Festival of Theatre (LIFT) 2018 was called 'Fly By Night' and featured 1,500 LED-lit, trained pigeons flying above the River Thames.

In 2023, the Ridgeway featured in the 'Thamesmead Light Festival: Light The Way' which incorporated a number of light sculptures on a walking trail between the Lakeside Arts Centre, Crossway Park and Sporting Club Thamesmead . That year, the Ridgeway was also included as one of the 22 sites selected by the Mayor of London for the second round of his Rewild London Fund to create a 'Thamesmead Pollinator Corridor'.

There is a Facebook group , Instagram page , and Twitter page  for Ridgeway Users.

Future proposals
There is an option to extend the Royal Arsenal Narrow Gauge (RANG) steam railway  from Crossness car park to Plumstead railway station via the Ridgeway.

At the western end of the Ridgeway, the housing association Peabody Trust have applied to build 930 homes adjacent to Plumstead bus garage. Improvements to existing public spaces around the development will include improvements to pathways that pass the Ridgeway. Proposals have been put forward by the Pharaoh Project to create a 'biodome' within the underpass at Pettman Crescent adjacent to the Plumstead entrance of the Ridgeway. Planning applications have been submitted for the construction of film studios opposite the entrance to the Ridgeway and Kellner Road, and within the disused Plumstead power station on White Hart Road to the South of the Ridgeway.

Peabody Trust have been working to open up access to the Ridgeway from the Thames Path and have partnered with Sustrans to work on proposals to develop a route from Southmere Lake via the Ridgeway through the former Thamesview Golf Centre to the River Thames.

TfL rail proposals
In a presentation by TfL to the Greenwich Council, they proposed an extension of the Gospel Oak to Barking London Overground train service from the new Barking Riverside station to Thamesmead Central and via Plumstead to Woolwich Arsenal that would take a route along the eastern section of the Ridgeway or Belvedere station using the eastern section of the Ridgeway.  However, other Overground and DLR options would not be using the Ridgeway.

Media
The Ridgeway was the subject of a radio show on Resonance FM in 2011. It also features in an app produced by London Borough of Bexley to promote heritage walking trails. To celebrate the launch of the Elizabeth line on 24 May 2022, the YouTuber Runderground Matt featured the Ridgeway in his run across the core section of the line from Abbey Wood to Paddington.

Gallery

References

Start and end points
 The route's western start point
 The route's eastern end point

Cycleways in London
Greenways
Footpaths in London
London water infrastructure
Elevated parks